Hannelore (Hanni) Wenzel (born 14 December 1956) is a retired Liechtensteiner alpine ski racer. Weirather is a former Olympic, World Cup, and world champion. She won Liechtenstein's first-ever Olympic medal at the 1976 Winter Olympics in Innsbruck, Austria, and its first two Olympic gold medals four years later in Lake Placid, New York.

Biography
Born in West Germany at Straubing, Bavaria, Wenzel moved to Liechtenstein at an early age. After she and her younger brother Andreas had success in ski racing – Hanni won the gold medal in slalom and silver in the combined at the 1974 World Championships – the family was granted Liechtenstein citizenship. Winning the slalom title on 8 February 1974, she did become the youngest female Alpine Skiing World Champion in the Slalom discipline (17 years, 1 month, 25 days) - ousting Esme Mackinnon who was the first female Alpine Skiing Champion in 1931; the British racer was 17 years, 2 month and 17 days young when she was victorious in the slalom race on 19 February 1931. 
At the 1976 Winter Olympics in Innsbruck, she won the country's first Olympic medal, a bronze in the slalom at Axamer Lizum, and also picked up another world championship medal in the combined.

After winning the World Cup overall title in 1978, Wenzel's best year came in 1980. At the 1980 Winter Olympics in Lake Placid, she won gold medals in the slalom and giant slalom, and just missed out on a sweep by taking the silver in the downhill at Whiteface Mountain. She also easily won the world championship gold medal in the combined event, its final edition as a "paper race" and her fourth world championship medal in that event. At the same Olympics, her brother also won a silver medal, placing Liechtenstein high in the medal ranking of the games.  In addition to her Olympic success, she won nine World Cup races in 1980 and captured the overall, giant slalom, and combined season titles, and brother Andreas won the men's overall for a Wenzel family sweep of the overall titles. Her daughter Tina Weirather won a bronze medal in Super-G for Liechtenstein at the 2018 Winter Olympics in PyeongChang.

Wenzel was banned from the 1984 Winter Olympics by the International Ski Federation (FIS) for accepting promotional payments directly, rather than through the national ski federation. Ingemar Stenmark of Sweden was also banned; both were double gold medalists in 1980.

Wenzel retired following the 1984 season with two Olympic titles, four World titles, two overall World Cups, three discipline World Cups plus three combined titles, and 33 World Cup victories. (Through 1980, the Olympics were also the World Championships.)

Through the 2018 Winter Olympics, Liechtenstein has won a total of ten medals at the Winter Olympics, with eight won by two sets of siblings – the Wenzels earned six, while brothers Willi and Paul Frommelt are responsible for two more.

World cup results

Season titles
7 titles – (2 overall, 2 giant slalom, 1 slalom, 2 combined)

Season standings

Race victories
 33 wins – (11 SL, 12 GS, 2 DH, 8 K)
 89 podiums

World Championship results 

From 1948 through 1980, the Winter Olympics were also the World Championships for alpine skiing.
At the World Championships from 1954 through 1980, the combined was a "paper race" using the results of the three events (DH, GS, SL).

Olympic results  

Wenzel and Ingemar Stenmark were banned from the 1984 Olympics (endorsement compensation).

Family
Wenzel is a sister of World Cup ski racers Petra Wenzel and Andreas Wenzel, and the wife of Austrian ski racer Harti Weirather, the world champion in downhill in 1982. Wenzel and Weirather run their own sports marketing agency, and their daughter Tina Weirather is also a World Cup ski racer.

Honours
 Commander's Cross of the Order of Merit of the Principality of Liechtenstein (06/09/2017).

See also
List of FIS Alpine Ski World Cup women's race winners
List of Olympic medalist families

References

External links
 
 wwp-group.com – Weirather-Wenzel & Partner GmbH – 

1956 births
Living people
German female alpine skiers
Liechtenstein female alpine skiers
Olympic alpine skiers of Liechtenstein
Olympic gold medalists for Liechtenstein
Olympic silver medalists for Liechtenstein
Olympic bronze medalists for Liechtenstein
Olympic medalists in alpine skiing
Medalists at the 1976 Winter Olympics
Medalists at the 1980 Winter Olympics
Alpine skiers at the 1976 Winter Olympics
Alpine skiers at the 1980 Winter Olympics
FIS Alpine Ski World Cup champions
German emigrants to Liechtenstein
People from Straubing
Sportspeople from Lower Bavaria